Mesehti was an ancient Egyptian nomarch of the 13th nomos of Upper Egypt ("the Upper Sycamore") around 2000 BCE, during the 11th Dynasty. He also was seal-bearer and overseer of the priests of Wepwawet.

Tomb

Mesehti is well known for his funerary equipment, found in Asyut at the end of 19th century during an illegal excavation. The contents of the tomb, which at the time of the discovery appeared undisturbed, was mainly sold to the Egyptian Museum in Cairo.

Among the objects of the funerary equipment, the most famous are the wooden models of soldiers: a group of striding Egyptian spearmen equipped with a hide shield and a white skirt, and another group composed of 40 striding nubian archers, darker-skinned and wearing a red loincloth.
The tomb also contained two large wooden coffins whose interior is richly decorated with Coffin Texts; these coffins are among the main sources for this type of religious texts, which were much used during the First Intermediate Period and the Middle Kingdom.

References

Bibliography 
 Michael Rice, Who is who in Ancient Egypt, 1999 (2004), p. 115. Routledge, London, .

Nomarchs
Overseers of the priests of Wepwawet
Officials of the Eleventh Dynasty of Egypt
Ancient Egyptian royal sealers